Survivor is the American version of the international Survivor reality competition television franchise, itself derived from the Swedish television series Expedition Robinson created by Charlie Parsons which premiered in 1997. The American series premiered on May 31, 2000, on CBS. It is hosted by Jeff Probst, who is also an executive producer along with Mark Burnett and the original creator, Parsons.

Survivor places a group of strangers in an isolated location, where they must provide food, fire, and shelter for themselves. The contestants compete in challenges including testing the contestants' physical ability like running and swimming or their mental abilities like puzzles and endurance challenges for rewards and immunity from elimination. The contestants are progressively eliminated from the game as they are voted out by their fellow contestants until only one remains and is given the title of "Sole Survivor" and is awarded the grand prize of US$1,000,000 ($2,000,000 in Winners at War).

The American version has been very successful. From the 2000–01 through the 2005–06 television seasons, its first eleven seasons (competitions) rated among the top ten most-watched shows. It is commonly considered the leader of American reality TV because it was the first highly-rated and profitable reality show on broadcast television in the U.S., and is considered one of the best shows of the 2000s (decade). The series has been nominated for 63 Emmy Awards, including winning for Outstanding Sound Mixing in 2001, Outstanding Special Class Program in 2002, and was subsequently nominated four times for Outstanding Reality-Competition Program when the category was introduced in 2003. Probst won the award for Outstanding Host for a Reality or Reality-Competition Program four consecutive times after the award was introduced in 2008. In 2007, the series was included in Time magazine's list of the 100 greatest TV shows of all time. In 2013, TV Guide ranked it at #39 on its list of the "60 Best Series of All Time".

In March 2022, the series was renewed for a 43rd and 44th season, and the 44th season premiered on March 1, 2023. In February 2023, the series was renewed for the 2023–24 television season.

Format and rules

The first U.S. season of Survivor followed the same general format as the Swedish series. Sixteen or more players, split between two or more "tribes", are taken to a remote isolated location (usually in a tropical climate) and are forced to live off the land with meager supplies for 39 days (42 in The Australian Outback, 26 in post-COVID seasons). Frequent physical and mental challenges are used to pit the teams against each other for rewards, such as food or luxuries, or for "immunity", forcing the other tribe to attend "Tribal Council", where they must vote off one of their tribemates.

Signaling the halfway point in the game, survivors from both tribes come together to live as one, making it to the "merge". At this point, survivors will compete against each other to win individual immunity; winning immunity prevents that player from being voted out at Tribal Council. Most players that are voted out after the merge form the game's "jury". Once the group gets down to two or three people, a Final Tribal Council is held where the remaining players plead their case to the jury members. The jury then votes for which player should be considered the "Sole Survivor" and win the show's grand prize. In all seasons for the United States version (excluding Survivor: Winners at War), this has included a $1-million prize in addition to the Sole Survivor title; some seasons (particularly earlier seasons) have included additional prizes offered during the game, such as a car, as well as fan-favorite prizes awarded at the finale. All contestants are paid on a sliding scale based on the order they were voted out: the first player voted out has been given  and the amount increases from there. All players are offered  for participating in the finale show.

The U.S. version has introduced numerous modifications, or "twists", on the core rules in order to keep the players on their toes and to prevent players from relying on strategies that succeeded in prior seasons. These changes have included tribal switches, seasons starting with more than two tribes, the ability to exile a player from a tribe for a short time, unannounced returning players, hidden immunity idols that players can use to save themselves or others at Tribal Council, special voting powers which can be used to influence the result at Tribal Council, chance to return to regular gameplay after elimination through the "Redemption Island," "Edge of Extinction" or "The Outcast Tribe" twists, and a final four fire-making challenge as of season 35.

Series overview

The United States version is produced by Mark Burnett and hosted by Jeff Probst, who also serves as an executive producer. Each competition is called a season, has a unique name, and lasts from 13 to 16 episodes. The first season, Survivor: Borneo, was broadcast as a summer replacement show in 2000. Starting with the third season, Survivor: Africa, there have been two seasons aired during each U.S. television season. Starting with the forty-first season, no subtitle has been used in promotion of the season. Instead, the show began following a number format similar to Big Brother and The Amazing Race.

In the first season, there was a 75-person crew. By season 22, the crew had grown to 325 people.

A total of 662 contestants have competed on Survivors 44 seasons.

Production

Concept
The original idea of Survivor was developed by Charlie Parsons in 1994 under the name Castaway. Parsons formed Planet24 with Bob Geldof to produce the show and tried to have the BBC broadcast it, but the network turned it down. Parsons went to Swedish television and was able to find a broadcaster, ultimately producing Expedition Robinson in 1997. The show was a success, and plans for international versions were made.

Mark Burnett intended to be the person to bring the show to the United States, though he recognized that the Swedish version was a bit crude and mean-spirited. Burnett retooled the concept to use better production values, based on his prior Eco-Challenge show, and wanted to focus more on the human drama experienced while under pressure. Burnett spent about a year trying to find a broadcaster that would take the show, retooling the concept based on feedback. On November 24, 1999, Burnett made his pitch to Les Moonves of CBS, and Moonves agreed to pick up the show. The first season, Survivor: Borneo, was filmed during March and April 2000, and was first broadcast on May 31, 2000. The first season became a ratings success, leading to its current ongoing run.

Locations
The American version of Survivor has been shot in many locations around the world since the first season, usually favoring warm and tropical climates. Starting with season 19, two seasons have filmed back-to-back in the same location, to be aired in the same broadcast year. Since season 33, the show has been filmed in the Mamanuca Islands of Fiji.

From The Australian Outback to Island of the Idols, the show's run ended with a live reveal of the winner with votes read in front of a live studio audience, followed by a reunion show, hosted by Jeff Probst. Reunion shows for the first three seasons were hosted by Bryant Gumbel and the fourth season by Rosie O'Donnell. Between Africa and One World the reunion locations alternated between Central Park, Madison Square Garden and the Ed Sullivan Theater in New York City (home to the CBS's Late Show franchise) and CBS Television City or the CBS Studio Center in Los Angeles. The reunion show continued to be filmed at CBS Television City from Philippines to Island of the Idols.

The exceptions to the above outlined live reunion were for Survivor: Island of the Idols, which was filmed in front of a live studio audience but taped four hours in advance due to the controversy surrounding contestant Dan Spilo's behavior, and Survivor: Winners at War, where a video conferencing event was used during the broadcast of the final episode due to the COVID-19 pandemic. The final episode of the latter did not include the live reunion, except for a brief moment at the beginning of the episode where all 20 contestants appeared together on screen from their homes, and promo for the upcoming 41st season, as the 41st season had not filmed at that time.

As part of this, up through Survivor: Cagayan, the production of the last part of the recorded final Tribal Council showed Probst taking the urn or container containing the votes and traveling with it by some means, transitioning this to the live show and suggesting a type of continuity between events; for example Survivor: The Amazon appeared to have Probst jet-ski from the Amazon rainforest directly to New York City where the live show was held. According to Probst, they had also filmed a similar sequence for the 29th season Survivor: San Juan del Sur: he had paddled out on a canoe from the location in Nicaragua, and then paddling into Venice, California from a nearby island. Once on the beach, he would have asked a teenager to borrow his skateboard in the same manner as the "Hey Kid, Catch!" Coke commercial with Mean Joe Greene, with Probst doing some tricks on the skateboard before tossing it back. However, Probst had no idea how to ride a skateboard and even after some basic training, he could not complete the trick for filming. Production opted to eliminate that transition for San Juan del Sur, and they eliminated any similar transitions for future seasons.

Beginning with season 41, the winner was revealed on location during the final tribal council, which was previously done in the original season (Borneo), as the producers were unsure on the ability to have a live finale due to the COVID-19 pandemic. The vote reveal was then followed by a Survivor After Show special with the final players and the jury instead of a live reunion.

Reception

U.S. television ratings
Survivor had consistently been one of the top 20 most watched shows through its first 23 seasons. It has not broken the top 20 since. Probst acknowledged that Kelly Kahl, the current president of CBS, had been a significant proponent of the show. When Survivor had launched, Kahl, then vice-president of scheduling, took a risk and moved the show's second season to Thursdays in competition with NBC's Friends. Survivor won viewership numbers over Friends, giving Kahl significant sway within CBS to continue supporting Survivor.

Seasonal rankings (based on average total viewers per episode) of the United States version of Survivor on CBS.

Note: Each U.S. network television season starts in late September and ends in late May, which coincides with the completion of May sweeps.

Awards and nominations

Primetime Emmy Awards

Other awards

Post-show auctions
At the end of each U.S. Survivor season from Survivor: Africa onward, various Survivor props and memorabilia are auctioned online for charity. The most common recipient has been the Elizabeth Glaser Pediatric AIDS Foundation. Most recently, proceeds have gone toward The Serpentine Project, a charity founded by Jeff Probst, dedicated to helping those transitioning out of foster care upon emancipation at 18 years of age. Items up for auction have included flags, mats, tree mails, contestant torches, contestant clothing, autographed items, immunity idols and the voting urn.

Controversies and legal action
In February 2001, Stacey Stillman filed a lawsuit claiming that producers interfered in the process of Survivor: Borneo by persuading two members of her tribe (Sean Kenniff and Dirk Been) to vote her off instead of Rudy Boesch.
During a reward trip on Survivor: The Australian Outback, Colby Donaldson removed coral from the Great Barrier Reef and, on the same trip, a helicopter involved with the production crew flew around protected seabird rookeries. Both acts violated Australian law and the incidents could have resulted in fines up to A$110,000. Mark Burnett, the executive producer, issued an apology on behalf of Donaldson and the Survivor production team.
At the tribal immunity challenge for the final four players on Survivor: Africa, host Jeff Probst asked which female player in their season had no piercings. Kim Johnson answered Kelly Goldsmith, got the point, and went on to win the challenge, which put her through to the final three and ultimately (after winning another immunity challenge) the final two. Unbeknownst to the producers, another contestant on "Africa", Lindsey Richter, also had no piercings. Lex van den Berghe's answer had been Lindsey, but the show did not award him a point, which could have significantly changed the outcome of the challenge and the overall game. CBS later paid van den Berghe and Tom Buchanan, who had finished in fourth place, a settlement.
In the fifth episode of Survivor: All-Stars, a naked Richard Hatch came into contact with Sue Hawk after she blocked his path during an immunity challenge. Hatch was voted out that day for other reasons, but Hawk quit the game two days later as a result of what had happened. Hawk considered filing a lawsuit against the parties involved, but appeared with Hatch on The Early Show the morning after the sixth episode aired, stating she opted out of legal action because CBS had helped her "deal with the situation".
In January 2006, Richard Hatch, the winner of the first season of Survivor, was charged and found guilty of failing to report his winnings to the IRS to avoid taxes. He was sentenced to four years and three months in prison.
In the beginning of Survivor: Cook Islands, the tribes were grouped according to their race. Probst claimed the choice came from the criticism that Survivor was "not ethnically diverse enough", but several long-term sponsors, including Campbell's Soup, Procter & Gamble, Home Depot, and Coca-Cola dropped their support of the show shortly after this announcement, leading to speculation that the decisions were in response to the controversy. Each company has either denied the link to the controversy or declined to comment.
The selection process for the 14th season came under fire when it was revealed that, of the entire Survivor: Fiji cast, only Gary Stritesky had gone through the application process for the show; the rest of the contestants were recruited. Probst defended the process, citing finding diversity of cast as a reason.
At the Survivor: China reunion show, Denise Martin told producers and the audience that she had been demoted to a janitor from a lunch lady due to the distraction she was to students from her appearance on the show. Because of her misfortune, Burnett awarded Martin $50,000. But Martin would later recant her story after the school district she worked for publicly stated that she had taken the custodial position before appearing on the show. Martin then decided to donate the $50,000 to charity.
A brief uncensored shot of Marcus Lehman's genitals during the premiere episode of Survivor: Gabon led to the show and network being asked to apologize for the incident.
Jim Early (aka Missyae), who was a user on one of the fan forums for Survivor, was sued by Burnett, his production company, and CBS in August 2010, for allegedly releasing detailed spoiler information for Survivor: Samoa and Survivor: Heroes vs. Villains. Early revealed that he was getting his information from Russell Hantz, a contestant on both seasons, through both phone calls and emails. Early complied in the lawsuit by providing such evidence, eventually leading to its dismissal in January 2011. Although legal action was never taken against Hantz, the contract for a player in Survivor includes a liability of up to $5 million for the premature revealing of a season's results. Hantz has stated that the claim is false.
Contestants that did not make the jury in Survivor: Caramoan were not allowed on stage for the reunion show. While Jeff Probst claimed that the new stage could not accommodate all of the attending contestants, the format change was panned because the show's fans and fellow contestants felt that it was unfair for them to be left out in the audience. Erik Reichenbach, who finished 5th and did not even get a chance to speak at the reunion, called out the producers for their treatment of the contestants. Calling it a farce, he criticized how the reunion show left so many unanswered questions about the other contestants and his own evacuation during the season finale. He also criticized how the pre-jury members were completely left out in favor of featuring the show's former contestants, like Rob Mariano and Rudy Boesch.
In the sixth episode of Survivor: Game Changers, Jeff Varner revealed at Tribal Council that fellow contestant Zeke Smith was a transgender man. This caused an immediate uproar amongst his tribemates and host Jeff Probst, which led to Varner's immediate elimination. The incident was covered by various news outlets, with fans heavily criticizing Varner's actions. Varner explained himself following the episode's airdate and expressed regret for his actions. Varner was also fired from his real estate job after the episode aired.
Before the premiere of Survivor: David vs. Goliath, contestant Alec Merlino posted a photo of himself on Instagram with fellow contestant Kara Kay containing the caption "F*** it". This action broke Merlino's NDA with the show and was consequently stripped of all appearance fees and banned from the live reunion show. Due to this, Merlino did not have to pay the standard $5 million penalty for breaking the agreement.
In the eighth episode of the 39th season Survivor: Island of the Idols, contestant Dan Spilo was issued a warning by producers for inappropriately touching fellow contestants including Kellee Kim. Contestants Elizabeth Beisel and Missy Byrd came under fire for their misuse of this situation as a strategic tool in voting out Kim later that episode. This moment has since been criticized by various news outlets for the reactions of Beisel and Byrd as well as the handling of the situation by producers. Beisel and Byrd later apologized, along with fellow contestants Lauren Beck and Aaron Meredith. Jeff Probst, CBS, and MGM released a statement about what happened and the production's reaction as well. Dan was later removed from the game at the end of episode 12 after "a report of another incident, which happened off-camera and did not involve a player". This is the first time a contestant has been ejected from the show by production. Spilo apologized to all involved for his behavior following the finale's broadcast. Because of the incident, the season's finale was not shown live but instead from an earlier live-to-tape recording, the first time since the live finale format was introduced. Further, CBS and Survivor announced they will revamp the show's rules and production to focus more on earlier detection and prevention of this type of inappropriate behavior, and strict penalties for castaways that engage in it, to be fully in place by the 41st season (the first season produced following the airing of Island of the Idols).

Merchandise
The success of Survivor spawned a wide range of merchandise from the very first season. While early items available were limited to buffs, water bottles, hats, T-shirts, and other typical souvenir items, the marketability of the franchise has grown tremendously. Today, fans can find innumerable items, including computer and board games, interactive online games, mugs, tribal-themed jewelry, beach towels, dog tags, magnets, multi-function tools, DVD seasons, Survivor party kits, insider books, soundtracks, and more.

Home media releases 
Best of

Full seasons
Seasons 1, 2, 7, 8, 9 and 10 were released in stores. The remaining seasons have been released exclusively on Amazon.com through their CreateSpace manufacture on demand program. Select seasons have also been released on Blu-ray.

Paramount+
All seasons are available on Paramount+, ViacomCBS's over-the-top subscription streaming service in the United States and Australia. In the United States and Australia, seasons of Australian Survivor made after CBS acquired Network 10 in 2017 are also available.

Pluto TV
Survivor was added to Pluto TV, ViacomCBS's free Internet television service, as a standalone channel along on September 1, 2020.

Other media

Video games
The 2001 PC video game Survivor: The Interactive Game, developed by Magic Lantern and published by Infogrames, allows players to play and create characters for the game based on the Borneo or Australian Outback cast members. The game also includes a character creation system for making custom characters.

Gameplay consists of choosing survivors' skills (fishing, cooking, etc.), forming alliances, developing relationships with other tribe members, and voting off competitors at tribal council.

The game was very poorly received by critics. GameSpot gave the game a 'Terrible' score of 2.0 out of 10, saying "If you're harboring even a tiny urge to buy this game, please listen very carefully to this advice: Don't do it." Likewise, IGN gave the game a 'Painful' 2.4 out of 10, stating "It is horribly boring and repetitive. The graphics are weak and even the greatest Survivor fan would break the CD in two after playing it for 20 minutes." The game was the recipient of Game Revolution's lowest score of all time, an F-. An 'interactive review' was created specially for the game, and features interactive comments like "The Survival periods are about as much fun as" followed by a drop-down menu, "watching paint dry/throbbing hemorrhoids/staring at air/being buried alive."

On November 4, 2009, it was announced that a second video game adaptation would be released for the Wii and Nintendo DS. The game would require players to participate in various challenges like those in the reality shows in order to win.

Soundtracks
Various soundtracks have been released featuring music composed by Russ Landau, including soundtracks for seasons 9 through 27 (with the exception of season 14).

Thrill ride
The Tiki Twirl thrill ride at California's Great America in Santa Clara, California was originally called Survivor: The Ride. The ride includes a rotating platform that moves along an undulating track. Riders can be sprayed by water guns hidden in oversized tribal masks. Theme elements included drums and other familiar Survivor musical accents playing in the background, Survivor memorabilia throughout the queue and other merchandise for sale in nearby gift shops.

Notes

References

External links

 
 
 

 
Adventure reality television series
Reality competition television series
2000 American television series debuts
2000s American reality television series
2010s American reality television series
2020s American reality television series
2000s American game shows
2010s American game shows
2020s American game shows
American television series based on Swedish television series
CBS original programming
Television series by CBS Studios
English-language television shows
Nielsen ratings winners
Primetime Emmy Award-winning television series
Television series by MGM Television
Television shows set in Africa
Television shows set in Asia
Television shows set in North America
Television shows set in Oceania
Television shows set in South America